Mohammad Alavi Tabar (also known as Kiyavash; 1930 – 10 March 2020) was an Iranian politician.

Biography
Mohammad Alavi Tabar was born in 1930 in Zanjan.  He was a follower of jurisprudential Islam.

Mohammad Alavi Tabar served as a member of the Iranian Parliament representing Ahvaz between 1980 and 1984, representing Abadan between 1984 and 1988.

Mohammad Alavi Tabar died from COVID-19 on 10 March 2020. His funeral was held on 12 March.

Role in Cinema Rex fire
Alireza Nourizadeh, who met with SAVAK heads after cinema Rex fire, quoted that Kiavash was the middle person between Najaf clerics and Hossein Takbalizadeh, who was later executed for the arson. Cinema Rex fire triggered the overthrow of Shah and success of Islamic Revolution of Iran.

References 

1930 births
2020 deaths
People from Zanjan, Iran
Members of the 1st Islamic Consultative Assembly
Members of the 2nd Islamic Consultative Assembly
20th-century Iranian politicians
Deaths from the COVID-19 pandemic in Iran